James Grundy may refer to:

 James Grundy (chess player) (1855–1919), English-American chess master
 James Grundy (cricketer) (1824–1873),  English cricketer
 James Grundy (politician), British politician

See also
 Jimmy Grundy (politician) (1923–2020), American politician and businessman